Wilfried van Moer (1 March 1945 – 24 August 2021) was a Belgian footballer who won the Belgian Golden Shoe three times, first in 1966 while at Antwerp then in 1969 and in 1970 while at Standard Liège.

Prior to 1966 Van Moer played with Beveren. He returned to his first club after a spell at Beringen in the early 1980s.

He played 57 times and scored nine goals for the Belgium national team between 1966 and 1982, starting in a 1–0 friendly win against Switzerland on 22 October 1966. Van Moer was in the team for the 1970 and 1982 World Cups and for the Euro 1980 in which Belgium finished second.

Club career
Born in Beveren-Waas, Van Moer began with home town club Beveren-Waas, then in the third tier of the Belgian League. A move to Royal Antwerp in 1965 was influenced not only by a chance to play in the 1st Division, but by the fact he was already working in that city as an electrician. He made his debut for the club in August 1965 against Union Saint-Gilloise. At the end of 1966 he won his first Golden Shoe Award, having won his first international cap earlier that year.

It was during his three years at Antwerp under the guidance of coach Harry Game, that Van Moer, against his wishes, was moved from a wide right role to central midfield, preparing him to eventually succeed to another of Belgium's most celebrated players Jef Jurion, in the national team.

Following relegation for Antwerp in 1968, a protracted move to Standard Liège ensued, Van Moer resisting the interest of 1. FC Köln to remain in Belgium, and also Club Brugge, with whom he had made a personal agreement. The €150,000 fee for the now established international was at the time a Belgian record.

Wonderful domestic success followed at Standard, winning the championship in 1969, 1970 and 1971 and making it a hat-trick of Golden Shoes by winning the award in both 1969 and 1970.

As for his club career, he had left Standard in 1976 and played for the Limburg first division team FC Beringen for a few seasons (he owned a café in the Limburg capital Hasselt). In 1980, after his career had been rekindled, he made a transfer to his original team SK Beveren (which had become Belgian champion in 1979). He stayed there for two more seasons and concluded his career in Limburg again at Sint-Truiden, where he became trainer-player.

International career
Van Moer was a regular for the Belgium national team, appearing in the 1970 FIFA World Cup and scoring twice in a 3–0 defeat of El Salvador, Belgium's only win in the tournament. Two years later, he played a key role in helping his country qualify for the semi-finals of the UEFA Euro 1972. After Belgium had defended stubbornly in a goalless quarter final, first leg in Italy, he scored the opening goal midway through the first half in the return at Anderlecht's Constant Vanden Stock Stadium. But then something was to happen, putting the Belgian's career on hold. On the stroke of half-time, Mario Bertini's lunge resulted in a broken leg for Van Moer, a bitter-sweet day for the home nation who ultimately celebrated a 2–1 victory.

Although he recovered, the leg-break and other injuries restricted his international appearances over the next three seasons. By October 1979, aged 34, without an appearance for The Red Devils for four and a half years, international football couldn't have been further from his thoughts. But wily Belgian coach Guy Thys had other ideas. Van Moer was an inspired choice for a Belgian side who had forgotten how to win, as they prepared to take on Portugal in a 'do or die' EC qualifier. Van Moer again came up trumps with the first goal in a 2–0 win. Van Moer also performed key roles in home and away victories over Scotland, which propelled Belgium to qualification for the Finals tournament in Italy.

Striker Horst Hrubesch may have scored two goals to secure final victory for West Germany, but for many the outstanding player of the tournament was the Belgian central midfielder with the seemingly boundless energy. He ran the show in most every game he played, scheming, prompting and holding the ball, never wasteful his performances were as dynamic as they were inspirational as Belgium went all the way to their only major Final. Van Moer was arguably the most influential player in the tournament and indeed at 35, his performances earned him fourth place (equalling the best ever showing by a Belgian) in the Ballon d'Or poll. Karl-Heinz Rummenigge, Bernd Schuster and Michel Platini finished ahead of him.

Van Moer's international career went on for another two years, long enough to appear in another World Cup Finals series. Named captain in the absence of Eric Gerets, for the second-phase game against Poland his international career ended when replaced by François Van der Elst at half-time. Belgium trailed by two at the interval and went on to lose 3–0, Poland's inspiration coming from Zbigniew Boniek who was the only player to score.

Managerial career
After he stopped playing football, he became coach with Sint-Truiden, SK Beveren, Assent and FC Diest, before calling it a day, somewhat disappointed by the general professional level of the Belgian football players.

He was called by the Belgian Football Union to do some prospective work and became assistant coach to national coach Paul Van Himst in 1995 after a few heavy defeats of the Red Devils. He succeeded Van Himst as a head coach in 1996 for five games.

However, people in the Football Union and the press were not very delighted by his lack of communicative skills and at the beginning of 1997, he was, in his turn, replaced by Georges Leekens. He has not taken up any managerial tasks since.

Death
Van Moer suffered a cerebral haemorrhage and died in a hospital in Leuven on 24 August 2021.

Honours 
Standard Liège
 Belgian First Division: 1968–69, 1969–70, 1970–71
 Belgian League Cup: 1975

Belgium
 UEFA European Championship: runners-up 1980
 Belgian Sports Merit Award: 1980

Individual
 Belgian Golden Shoe: 1966, 1969, 1970
 Ballon d'Or fourth place: 1980 
 Ballon d'Or nominations: 1971, 1981
 Belgian Golden Shoe of the 20th Century (1995): third place
Platina Eleven (Best Team in 50 Years of Golden Shoe Winners) (2003)
 The Best Golden Shoe Team Ever (2011)
 IFFHS All Time Belgium XI (2021)

References

External links

Belgium - Record International Players - RSSSF
xtratime.org - Xtratime

1945 births
2021 deaths
Belgian footballers
Association football midfielders
Belgium international footballers
Belgian Pro League players
Challenger Pro League players
K.S.K. Beveren players
Royal Antwerp F.C. players
Standard Liège players
Sint-Truidense V.V. players
Belgian football managers
Sint-Truidense V.V. managers
1970 FIFA World Cup players
UEFA Euro 1980 players
1982 FIFA World Cup players
Belgium national football team managers
K. Beringen F.C. players
People from Beveren
Footballers from East Flanders